Tony Gillies (born 25 April 1970) is a New Zealand cricket umpire. He has stood in matches in the Plunket Shield.

References

External links
 

1970 births
Living people
New Zealand cricket umpires
Sportspeople from Sydney